Nusret Çetinel (26 January 1952 – 1 September 2021) was a Turkish actor.

Filmography

References

External links 
 
 

1952 births
2021 deaths
Turkish male film actors
Turkish male television actors
Male actors from Ankara